The 1996–97 Logan Cup was a first-class cricket competition held in Zimbabwe from 4 October 1996 – 24 November 1996. It was won by Mashonaland, who won two of the three games to top the table.

Points table

References

1996 in cricket
1996 in Zimbabwean sport
Domestic cricket competitions in 1996–97
Logan Cup